Currier Island is the namesake fictional country of a national team playing ultimate frisbee.

The "country" has participated in all World Beach Ultimate tournaments since 2004.

In WCBU2015 (world national beach tournament 2015) in Dubai, Currier Island sent five teams in the divisions: mixed, masters open, masters mixed, masters women and grand masters

History 

Currier Island is an ultimate frisbee team that began as a fictional island nation created by Ivan Cestero and Minh Le. In the Fall of 2004, the first World Champions Beach Ultimate (sport)  was held in Figuiera de Foz, Portugal. In order to play in the tournament, players needed to be on the official roster of a country's team. The United States roster was already filled. In order to play in the tournament, Cestero and Le (who played ultimate together at Dartmouth College) along with other Dartmouth class of '01 alums (Michael Holmes, Christopher Taylor, Craig Davis, and Michael Gallagher), decided to create a fictional island nation to represent.

Le wrote a letter to the head of the WCBU as the Secretary of Foreign Affairs for Currier Island, stating that the tournament would not be a true world championship if Currier Island was not invited to compete. Together, Cestero and Le convinced the tournament directors to allow Currier Island into the tournament.

Shortly thereafter, the tournament directors replied to Le and Cestero inquiring as to the geographic location of Currier Island, as they were unable to find it online or on any maps. Le and Cestero admitted that the island was fictitious, but the tournament committee decided to allow Currier Island to compete as an international pick-up team. It was decided that at every WCBU tournament from then on, an international team would be allowed to play under the flag of Currier Island. 

The inaugural Currier Island team consisted of players from the U.S., Hungary, Austria, and South Africa. After a week-long training camp in Tarifa, Currier Island beat countries such as Spain, Italy, Portugal, Ireland, and Finland to finish 10th in the first annual World Beach Championships. 

The Currier Island team has continued to play in beach ultimate tournaments around the world, including Paganello in Italy, Boracay Open in the Philippines, and Wildwood in New Jersey.

Limitations of eligibility 

While Currier Island can compete, not being a real country they can't play in the Knockout stages of tournaments.
The first time the rule had to be used was in 2015 in Dubai, where one of the divisions had a Currier Island team winning a place in the knock out bracket

References
 The Story of Currier Islands in GetHorizonal
 some details in Beach 2004 website

Flying disc